Jean François Mbaye is a French politician of La République En Marche! (LREM) who served as a member of the French National Assembly from 2017 to 2022, representing the department of Val-de-Marne.

Political career
In parliament, Mbaye served on the Committee on Foreign Affairs. In addition to his committee assignments, he chaired the French-Gambian Parliamentary Friendship Group.

In early 2019, Mbaye received a racist letter in which the unnamed author promised him “a bullet in the head”; in response, he pressed charges.

In 2020, Mbaye joined En Commun (EC), a group within LREM led by Barbara Pompili.

He lost his seat in the 2022 French legislative election.

Political positions
In July 2019, Mbaye was one of nine LREM members who voted against his parliamentary group's majority and opposed the French ratification of the European Union's Comprehensive Economic and Trade Agreement (CETA) with Canada.

Other activities
 UNITE – Parliamentary Network to End HIV/AIDS, Viral Hepatitis and Other Infectious Diseases, Member (since 2019)

See also
 2017 French legislative election

References

1979 births
Living people
Deputies of the 15th National Assembly of the French Fifth Republic
La République En Marche! politicians
People from Dakar
Senegalese emigrants to France
Black French politicians

Members of Parliament for Val-de-Marne
21st-century French politicians